Peter Manley Scott (born 1961) is a British theologian and Samuel Ferguson Professor of Applied Theology & Director of the Lincoln Theological Institute at the University of Manchester.
He is best known for his research on political theology. Scott is the Chair of the European Forum for the Study of Religion and the Environment.

Books
 Theology, Ideology and Liberation, Cambridge University Press, 1994
 A Political Theology of Nature, Cambridge University Press, 2003
 Anti-human Theology: Nature, Technology and the Postnatural, SCM, 2010
 A Theology of Postnatural Right, LIT Verlag, 2019
 Blackwell Companion to Political Theology (ed.), 2004, 2nd edition 2019

References

External links
Peter Manley Scott at the University of Manchester

21st-century British philosophers
Philosophy academics
Living people
1961 births
Political philosophers
Political theologians
Alumni of the University of Bristol
Academics of the University of Manchester
Academics of the University of Gloucestershire
Philosophers of religion
Marxist theorists
21st-century British theologians